
Gmina Walim is a rural gmina (administrative district) in Wałbrzych County, Lower Silesian Voivodeship, in south-western Poland.

Neighbouring gminas
Gmina Walim is bordered by the towns of Jedlina-Zdrój, Pieszyce and Wałbrzych, and the gminas of Głuszyca, Nowa Ruda and Świdnica.

Villages
The gmina contains the villages of Dziećmorowice, Glinno, Jugowice, Michałkowa, Niedźwiedzice, Olszyniec, Podlesie, Rzeczka, Walim and Zagórze Śląskie.

Twin towns – sister cities

Gmina Walim is twinned with:
 Harkakötöny, Hungary

References

Walim
Wałbrzych County